Corone may refer to:

 Koroni, also spelled Corone, a town in Greece
 Corone (crow), a character in Greek mythology

See also 
 Coronis (disambiguation)